SS  's Jacob<ref group=Note>The ship's (and namesake's) name is now commonly seen as s' Jacob in modern web references and some printed material; however, both Australian and U.S. official histories and Lloyd's Register clearly show  's Jacob (Lloyd's uses  'sJacob without spacing). The ship, after seeking refuge in Australia during the Japanese invasion of the islands, became part of the Southwest Pacific Area (SWPA) command's permanent local fleet. 's Jacob was sunk off Papua New Guinea on 8 March 1943 during World War II by Japanese air attack.

World War II service
The ship was engaged in logistics support for Allied forces in the efforts to hold the Malay Barrier by the American-British-Dutch-Australian Command (ABDA). During the final days before Java fell, she was in convoy MS.4 of four tankers and another cargo ship departing Sydney 31 January bound for the ABDA area taking a route south of Australia and up the west coast. On 15 February, the day Singapore fell and as  took over the escort, ports in Sumatra were falling and the tankers and other cargo vessel were ordered to return to Fremantle.  's Jacob  and Perth continued to be later joined by the Dutch ships Swartenhondt and  until, on the evening of 21 February and some 600 miles south of the Sunda Strait, they too were ordered to return to Fremantle. 's Jacob was one of the 21 KPM ships that sought refuge in Australia on the fall of Java that the Commanding General, United States Army Forces in Australia (USAFIA) was instructed to purchase or charter for the SWPA's permanent local fleet. On 26 March 1942, the Chief Quartermaster, USAFIA arranged interim charters pending final negotiations with the Netherlands Government in London. Final negotiations between the War Shipping Administration (WSA) and the Dutch government resulted in their being placed under U.S. Army control through a complex charter arrangement in which the British Ministry War Transport (BMWT) chartered the KPM vessels and with WSA allocated them to SWPA with the stipulation they be under total control of the U.S. Army. They typically were crewed by KPM's Dutch officers and Javanese crew. As part of the war effort,  's Jacob was upgraded and a 4-inch naval gun was mounted aft.

The ship was involved in the early days of reinforcements for Port Moresby and Milne Bay in New Guinea. On 5 September, the convoy was holding south of China Strait as Japanese naval forces were expected in Milne Bay that night. Arunta escorted Anshun into the port the next day with Swan and  's Jacob awaiting orders south of the strait where they were joined in the night by Arunta. Meanwhile, Anshun was discharging cargo by lights when the port was attacked by Japanese surface forces and she was shelled and capsized by the light cruiser . 's Jacob entering Milne Bay was considered an unnecessary risk, and the escorts were ordered to Port Moresby until the situation stabilized. 's Jacob, escorted by the Australian corvette  as part of Operation Lilliput, was transporting troops, weapons, and supplies from Milne Bay to Oro Bay. On 8 March 1943, as  's Jacob rounded Cape Nelson, nine high-flying Imperial Japanese bombers escorted by 12 fighters attacked her near Porlock Bay. The aircraft scored three direct hits and at least 15 near misses, which caused serious structural damage and wounded several crewmen. A large fire started on the foreship, and with the water pumps shutting down preventing any effort to extinguish the fire, the order was given to abandon ship. All those aboard had to jump overboard and clung to wreckage. 158 men were picked up by Bendigo, two of which died on the way to Milne Bay. Within 18 minutes of the attack,  's Jacob slid under the waves at 13:16 off Porlock Harbour.

Five men were lost in the sinking, including Private George Watson, who remained in the water and instead of trying to save himself, assisted soldiers who could not swim into life rafts. George Watson was posthumously awarded the Medal of Honor.

The ship's bell was recovered and later donated to the Lae Yacht Club.

Notes

References
Notes

Bibliography

External links
Schepen van de K.P.M. in Oorlog (photos)

1907 ships
Ships built in Schiedam
Merchant ships of the Netherlands
World War II merchant ships of the Netherlands
Transport ships of the United States Army
Ships sunk by Japanese aircraft
World War II shipwrecks in the Coral Sea
Shipwrecks of Papua New Guinea
Maritime incidents in March 1943
Merchant ships sunk by aircraft